Peter Birch may refer to:

 Peter Birch (priest) (–1710), Church of England clergyman and divine
 Peter Birch (actor) (1952–2017), British actor
 Peter Birch (bishop) (1911–1981), Roman Catholic bishop of Ossory, 1964–1981
 Peter Birch (Emmerdale), a fictional character in Emmerdale
 Peter Birch-Reichenwald (1843–1898), Norwegian politician